Malengamakali is an administrative ward in the Iringa Rural district of the Iringa Region of Tanzania. In 2016 the Tanzania National Bureau of Statistics report there were 8,284 people in the ward, from 7,917 in 2012.

Villages / vitongoji 
The ward has 6 villages and 27 vitongoji.

 Nyakavangala
 Ngega
 Nyakavangala A
 Nyakavangala B
 Nyakavangala C
 Isaka
 Idari
 Isaka A
 Isaka B
 Makegeke
 Makadupa
 Amani
 Makadupa kati
 Sokoine
 Iguluba
 Bomalang’ombe
 Iguluba Kati
 Msumbiji
 Mkulula
 Kikuyu
 Luganga A
 Luhomelo
 Lunganga B
 Mapalagaga
 Mbuyuni
 Stendi A
 Stendi B
 Usolanga
 Ihumbiliza A
 Ihumbiliza B
 Ihumbiliza C
 Kawemba
 Usolanga kati

References 

Wards of Iringa Region